The Real Housewives of Hungary (abbreviated RHOH) (FLK) is a Hungarian reality television series that debuted on Viasat 3. Developed as international installment of the Real Housewives franchise, it documents the personal and professional lives of several women residing in Budapest.

Series overview

Episodes

Season 1 (2017)

Season 2 (2018)

Special edition (2018)

Season 3 (2020)

Overview and casting
The series chronicles the lives of six Hungarian women.

References

External links
 

2010s Hungarian television series
2017 Hungarian television series debuts
Hungarian reality television series
Hungary
Hungarian-language television shows
Non-American television series based on American television series
Women in Hungary
Budapest
Viasat 3 original programming